Alexander Yevgenievich Kharitonov (born March 30, 1976) is a Russian former professional ice hockey right wing.

Career
Kharitonov was drafted in the third round, 81st overall, by the Tampa Bay Lightning in the 2000 NHL Entry Draft from HC Dynamo Moscow at the age of 24. He signed with the Lightning for the 2000-01 NHL season and played in sixty-six games in his rookie season, scoring seven goals and fifteen assists for twenty-two points. The following year, Kharitonov signed with the New York Islanders, but played just five games for the team as well as two games for the Bridgeport Sound Tigers of the American Hockey League before returning to Russia to play for Avangard Omsk.

Kharitonov later returned to Dynamo Moscow in 2003 and played the next five seasons with the team before joining Torpedo Nizhny Novgorod in the newly created Kontinental Hockey League in 2008. He later joined HC Sibir Novosibirsk the following year before spending the final two seasons of his career in the Supreme Hockey League for Rubin Tyumen and in the Professional Hockey League in Ukraine for Sokil Kiev.

Kharitonov was also a member of the Russian national team, playing in five World Championships as well as the 2006 Winter Olympics.

Career statistics

Regular season and playoffs

International

Honours
Russian Superleague: 2000
Russian Superleague: 2005
Euro Hockey Tour: 2005, 2006
IIHF European Champions Cup: 2006
Ceska Pojistovna Cup: 2006
Karjala Tournament: 2006
Channel One Cup: 2006

References

External links

1976 births
Living people
Avangard Omsk players
Bridgeport Sound Tigers players
HC Dynamo Moscow players
HC Sibir Novosibirsk players
Ice hockey players at the 2006 Winter Olympics
New York Islanders players
Olympic ice hockey players of Russia
Rubin Tyumen players
Russian ice hockey right wingers
Sokil Kyiv players
Ice hockey people from Moscow
Tampa Bay Lightning draft picks
Tampa Bay Lightning players
Torpedo Nizhny Novgorod players